Coleophora tarsocoma is a moth of the family Coleophoridae. It is found in north-eastern India (Assam, Khasi-Jaintia Hills, near Shillong).

Taxonomy
Research has concluded that Coleophora tarsocoma does not belong to the family Coleophoridae. It could belong to the family Cosmopterigidae.

References

tarsocoma
Moths of Asia